The following lists events that happened during 1954 in the Grand Duchy of Luxembourg.

Incumbents

Events

 The 1954 World Fencing Championships are held in Luxembourg City.

January – March
 1 January – D'Lëtzebuerger Land is launched as an independent weekly newspaper.

April – June
 20 May – Elections are held to the Chamber of Deputies.  The Christian Social People's Party gains 5 seats, while the Luxembourg Socialist Workers' Party and Democratic Party lose two each.
 29 June The Bech-Bodson Ministry is expanded, with Pierre Werner, Émile Colling, and Paul Wilwertz appointed to the government.

Births
 2 February – Jean Colombera, politician
 17 February – Archduchess Marie-Astrid of Austria
 7 March – Lydie Lorang, judge and member of the Council of State
 2 August – Walter Civitareale, composer
 26 October – Raymond Petit, artist
 17 November – Max Kohn, artist
 9 December – Jean-Claude Juncker, politician and Prime Minister
 Marc Jaeger, judge

Deaths
 3 March – Léon Metzler, jurist and politician
 15 May – Norbert Jacques, screenwriter
 31 July – Antoinette, Crown Princess of Bavaria

Footnotes

References
 

 
1950s in Luxembourg
Years of the 20th century in Luxembourg
Luxembourg
Luxembourg